Europini is a tribe of root-eating beetles in the family Monotomidae. There are about 8 genera and at least 40 described species in Europini.

Genera
These eight genera belong to the tribe Europini:
 Aneurops Sharp, 1900 i c g b
 Bactridium LeConte, 1861 i c g b
 Europs Wollaston, 1854 i c g b
 Hesperobaenus LeConte, 1861 i c g b
 Leptipsius Casey, 1916 i c g b
 Macreurops Casey, 1916 i c g b
 Phyconomus LeConte, 1861 i c g b
 Pycnotomina Casey, 1916 i c g b
Data sources: i = ITIS, c = Catalogue of Life, g = GBIF, b = Bugguide.net

References

Further reading

 
 
 
 
 
 
 
 
 
 
 
 

Monotomidae
Articles created by Qbugbot